The Pavilhão dos Barreiros is an indoor arena located in Funchal, Madeira, Portugal.

The facility is home to the roller hockey teams of C.S. Marítimo and Hoquei Clube da Madeira.

References

External links 

C.S. Marítimo
Indoor arenas in Portugal
Buildings and structures in Madeira